Liza Berggren (born 6 February  1986, in Mölndal, Sweden) is a Swedish fashion model and former Miss World Sweden.

Career
In 2005, she  was the Swedish delegate at 2005 Miss World pageant, held in Sanya, China after winning Miss World Sweden. Afterward, Berggren decided to become a fashion model. Berggren started her modeling career with Avenue Modeller. Under Avenue Modeller, she began to modeling other cities such as Milan, Copenhagen, and Berlin.

Berggren is predominantly an editorial model who has been featured in magazines such as Numero Magazine, Zink, Cosmopolitan Magazine, Viktor Magazine, and Love. She has appeared on the cover of Henne Magazine in Norway and was the face of Kristian Aadnevik in the Spring of 2011. Berggren has landed campaigns with AnneKarine, Farzan Esfahani, Carlings, Bjorklund, Christopher Kane, and P2 Summer.

References 

Living people
1986 births
Swedish beauty pageant winners
Miss World 2005 delegates
Swedish female models